General eXchange Format (GXF), is a file exchange format for the
transfer of simple  and compound clips between television program storage systems.  It is a container format that can contain Motion JPEG (M-JPEG), MPEG, or DV-based video compression standards, with associated audio, time code, and user data that may include user-defined metadata.

GXF was developed by Grass Valley Group, then standardized by SMPTE as SMPTE 360M, and was extended in SMPTE RDD 14-2007 to include high-definition video resolutions.

GXF has a fairly simple data model compared with SMPTE MXF container format since it should be used for file transfers and not as a storage format with no editing capabilities. SMPTE RDD 14-2007 is only 57 pages long, compared with many hundreds of pages for the MXF standards.

Applications and tools

Applications 
 The FFmpeg multimedia converter and VLC media player free video player support GXF;
 theScribe LITE is a GXF player that also supports MXF.

Parser and checker 
 Grassvalley offers a win32-based tool "tstream", for parsing GXF files and checking to ensure the contents conform to spec.

Tools 
 GXF::SDK is a C++ [SDK] that implements the GXF standard to ease the reading, creation, sub-clipping, merge and rewrap of GXF files. It supports: MPEG video, DV, PCM, AC3 and Dolby E audio, Timecode, AFD, VBI and ANC;
 GXFDShowFilter is a DirectShow filter that enables Windows MediaPlayer and other DirectShow-based applications to play back GXF files.

References

Broadcast engineering
Computer file formats
Film and video technology
SMPTE standards
Standards